4mm Games was a New York-based video game development company founded in 2008 by two founders of Rockstar Games, Jamie King and Gary Foreman along with former Image Metrics exec Nicholas Perrett, and Def Jam Enterprises, Warner Music Group and NBC executive Paul Coyne. 4mm was founded with the intent of bringing the experience of Constantly Connected Gaming to the next generation of gamers. OBE and former NCSoft CEO Geoff Heath was a member of the advisory board and offers strategic input.

The company released the Terminal Reality developed and Konami / Autumn Games published the hip-hop music game Def Jam Rapstar on October 5, 2010, in North America and November 26, 2010, in Europe for the PlayStation 3, Nintendo Wii, and Xbox 360.

4mm Games also released Dog Show Friends, a Facebook social game based on The National Dog Show Presented by Purina in conjunction with NBC Sports on November 24, 2010.

The company was working with Alli, the Alliance of Action Sports, to create new digital titles based on the organization's events. The plan was to release games based on sports such as snowboarding, skateboarding and motocross, as well as Alli tournaments such as the Dew Tour, Gatorade Free Flow Tour and Winter Dew Tour. According to 4mm, the games would have provided both "bite sized and fully immersive game play experiences" and would be released on a range of platforms, including mobiles, smartphones, TV, and web browser. The first of these games was to have been a free-to-play browser-based skateboarding game called Alli Skate.

Closure
The release of Def Jam Rapstar was lukewarm and a year later the web portal burned through available funds and was closed without warning. 4mm founder Jamie King later stated in an interview that the problem was that they became too ambitious and that he wished they had "either pushed the game back and made it for Kinect or [had it] come out a year earlier." 4mm continued to work on other projects such as an experiment with UK game developer Jagex. However, on March 31, 2012, EMI Music Group filed a suit against 4mm and Terminal Reality. The suit claims that the game uses 54 unlicensed tracks that EMI values at $150,000 each. On May 15, 2012, GameIndustry held an interview with King who stated that 4mm had run out of money and is on-hold. One of the reasons King cited was the ongoing lawsuit with EMI. Two months later, City National Bank sued Konami and Autumn Games for $8.9 million over a $15 million line of credit it approved for the game's development. It is unclear what affect, if any, the CNB lawsuit will have on any potential future of 4mm.

References

External links
Official website (defunct)
Def Jam Rapstar (defunct)
Dog Show Friends

Defunct video game companies of the United States
Video game development companies
Video game companies established in 2008
Video game companies disestablished in 2012
Mass media companies based in New York City
Defunct companies based in New York City